The Bible Christian Faith Church is a fundamental Reformed and Presbyterian denomination in Kenya, Africa with ties with the Free Presbyterian Church in Ulster.

The Bible Christian Faith Church was formed in 1980 when 15 congregations separated from the Africa Inland Church, a church in Eastern Africa related to Africa Inland Mission. The problem was the Biblical separation and the politics included the issues of the spiritual life and power of the church. It was registered by the government in 1996. Ten congregations left to join another denomination, meanwhile. The church cooperates with the Free Presbyterian Church of Ulster. Three female missionaries are working on the field. The Bible Christian Faith Church had 600 members and 6 congregations with 7 house fellowships in 2004. The denomination has a presbyterian-synodal government, and recognises the Apostles Creed and the Westminster Confession of Faith.

The Bible Christian Church has now eighteen churches and a Christian Academy in Kenya. There are two Christian Bookshops connected with this work.

References

Presbyterian denominations in Africa
Reformed denominations in Africa
Christian organizations established in 1980
Presbyterianism in Kenya
Fundamentalist denominations
1980 establishments in Kenya